Daiwa Major is a retired Japanese Thoroughbred racehorse and active sire. His greatest success, however, came later in his career when he won several of Japan's most important weight-for-age races including the Tennō Shō, the Yasuda Kinen and two runnings of the Mile Championship. He was twice named Japan's champion miler. Daiwa Major made a successful start to his stud career, siring a Group One winner in his first crop.

Background
Daiwa Major is a chestnut horse with a white blaze bred by the Shadai Farm in Hokkaido. He is an unusually large Thoroughbred, standing 16 hands 2½ inches high and weighing more than 530 kilograms during his racing career. He was sired by Sunday Silence, who won the 1989 Kentucky Derby, before retiring to stud in Japan where he was champion sire on thirteen consecutive occasions. His dam, Scarlet Bouquet, was a successful racemare, winning four times at Group Three level, who produced several other winners, most notably the filly Daiwa Scarlet. As a descendant of the American broodmare Your Hostess, she came from the same branch of Thoroughbred family 4-d which produced Majestic Prince, Secreto and Real Quiet. The horse was trained throughout his racing career by Hiroyuki Uehara.

Racing career

2003: two-year-old season
The racing career of Daiwa Major began on 27 December at Nakayama Racecourse where he contested a one-mile event for previously unraced horses. He finished second of the twelve runners, two lengths behind the winner.

2004: three-year-old season
Daiwa Major recorded his first success by winning a nine furlong maiden race at Nakayama and then finished fourth in a race over the same course and distance a month later. Despite his modest form he was moved up in class for the Group Two Spring Stakes and exceeded expectations by finishing third to Black Tide at odds of 72/1. In April, Daiwa Major was one of eighteen runners for the ten furlong Satsuki Shō, the first leg of the Japanese Triple Crown. Ridden by the first time by the Italian jockey Mirco Demuro he started a 31/1 outsider and won the Group One event by one and a quarter lengths from the favourite Cosmo Bulk. Daiwa Major failed to reproduce his best form in his remaining races that season. On 30 May he was moved up in distance for the Tokyo Yūshun (Japanese Derby) over one and a half miles at Tokyo Racecourse and, on his first start away from Nakayama, finished sixth behind King Kamehameha. In the autumn he was tried in all-aged competition and was unplaced in the All-Comers Stakes at Nakayama before finishing last of the seventeen runners behind Zenno Rob Roy in the autumn running of the Tennō Shō. At the end of the year, the colt underwent surgery to correct a respiratory problem.

2005: four-year-old season
Daiwa Major's only success in five starts as a four-year-old came on his debut when he won the Group Three Lord Derby Challenge Trophy at Nakayama in April. He then ran unplaced in the Yasuda Kinen in June and was beaten in a Group Three race at Niigata Racecourse in July. Returning in autumn, he ran unplaced in the Group Two Mainichi Okan but then displayed much improved form when he finished second by a nose to Hat Trick in the Group One Mile Championship at Kyoto Racecourse in November.

2006: five-year-old season

Daiwa Major began his most successful season by finishing second to Balance of Game in the Nakayama Kinen in February. In April he recorded his most important victory for two years when he defeated the mare Dance in the Mood by three quarters of a length in the Milers' Cup at Hanshin Racecourse: in this race he was ridden for the first time by Katsumi Andō, who became his regular jockey. In June he finished fourth behind the Hong Kong champion Bullish Luck in the Yasuda Kinen and was then fourth again behind Deep Impact in the eleven furlong Takarazuka Kinen.

In October, Daiwa Major returned to win the Group Two Mainichi Okan and was then sent to Tokyo for the autumn edition of the Tennō Shō. He started at odds of 6/1 in a field which included Admire Moon, Dance in the Mood, Cosmo Bulk, Hat Trick, Sweep Tosho and Company. He raced in second place before taking the lead in the straight and winning by half a length from Swift Current with Admire Moon in third. On 19 November Daiwa Major started 13/10 favourite for the Group One Mile Championship at Kyoto Racecourse. Andō repeated his tactics from the Tennō Shō by positioning the horse in second place before going to the front in the straight and Daiwa Major held the late challenge of Dance in the Mood to win by a neck. In December, Daiwa Major was one of fourteen runners invited to contest the Arima Kinen over twelve and a half furlongs at Nakayama. Racing well beyond his favoured distance, he finished third behind Deep Impact and Pop Rock

At the end of the season, Daiwa Major won the JRA Award for Best Sprinter or Miler gaining 200 of the 289 available votes. He also received one vote in the polls for Japanese Horse of the Year and JRA Award for Best Older Male Horse, which was enough to place him second behind Deep Impact in both categories. In the 2006 World Thoroughbred Racehorse Rankings, he was ranked the 20th best racehorse in the world.

2007: six-year-old season
In March 2007, Daiwa Major was sent to the United Arab Emirates to represent Japan in the nine furlong Dubai Duty Free at Nad Al Sheba Racecourse. He finished third of the sixteen runners behind Admire Moon and the South African challenger Linngari. The unplaced horses included English Channel, Miesque's Approval and Lava Man. On his return to Japan, Daiwa Major won the Yasuda Kinen at the third attempt, beating Kongo Rikishio by a neck, with the Hong Kong champion Good Ba Ba unplaced. Andō praised the horses performance, pointing out that he had been unsuited by the moderate pace, whilst Uehara expressed his relief that the horse had shown no ill effects from his trip to Dubai. Three weeks later the horse was moved up in distance for the Takarazuka Kinen and finished unplaced behind Admire Moon.

Daiwa Major's autumn campaign began disappointingly in October when he was beaten as the odds-on favourite for the Mainichi Okan and then finished unplaced behind Meisho Samson in the Tennō Shō. In November he returned to form to take the Mile Championship for the second successive time, as he "dug in gamely" to win by a neck from the four-year-old Super Hornet. Daiwa Major ended his racing career in December when he again moved up in distance to contest his second Arima Kinen. He finished third behind Matsurida Gogh, with second place being taken by his sister Daiwa Scarlet. The unplaced runners included Meisho Samson, Vodka, Pop Rock and Delta Blues.

At the end of the season, Daiwa Major won his second JRA Award for Best Sprinter or Miler gaining 234 of the 289 available votes. He also finished third in the poll for the Best Older Male Horse. In the 2007 World Thoroughbred Racehorse Rankings Daiwa Major was ranked the 29th best racehorse in the world.

Stud record
Daiwa Major retired to become a breeding stallion at the Shadai Stallion Station. In his first season at stud he sired the NHK Mile Cup winner Curren Black Hill.

Major winners

c = colt, f = filly

Pedigree

References

Racehorses bred in Japan
Racehorses trained in Japan
2001 racehorse births
Thoroughbred family 4-d